The open-design movement involves the development of physical products, machines and systems through use of publicly shared design information. This includes the making of both free and open-source software (FOSS) as well as open-source hardware. The process is generally facilitated by the Internet and often performed without monetary compensation. The goals and philosophy of the movement are identical to that of the open-source movement, but are implemented for the development of physical products rather than software. Open design is a form of co-creation, where the final product is designed by the users, rather than an external stakeholder such as a private company.

Origin 
Sharing of manufacturing information can be traced back to the 18th and 19th century. Aggressive patenting put an end to that period of extensive knowledge sharing.
More recently, principles of open design have been related to the free and open-source software movements. In 1997 Eric S. Raymond, Tim O'Reilly and Larry Augustin established "open source" as an alternative expression to "free software", and in 1997 Bruce Perens published The Open Source Definition. In late 1998, Dr. Sepehr Kiani (a PhD in mechanical engineering from MIT) realized that designers could benefit from open source policies, and in early 1999 he convinced Dr. Ryan Vallance and Dr. Samir Nayfeh of the potential benefits of open design in machine design applications. Together they established the Open Design Foundation (ODF) as a non-profit corporation, and set out to develop an Open Design Definition.

The idea of open design was taken up, either simultaneously or subsequently, by several other groups and individuals. The principles of open design are closely similar to those of open-source hardware design, which emerged in March 1998 when Reinoud Lamberts of the Delft University of Technology proposed on his "Open Design Circuits" website the creation of a hardware design community in the spirit of free software.

Ronen Kadushin coined the title "Open Design" in his 2004 Master's thesis, and the term was later formalized in the 2010 Open Design Manifesto.

Current directions 

The open-design movement currently unites two trends. On one hand, people apply their skills and time on projects for the common good, perhaps where funding or commercial interest is lacking, for developing countries or to help spread ecological or cheaper technologies. On the other hand, open design may provide a framework for developing advanced projects and technologies that might be beyond the resource of any single company or country and involve people who, without the copyleft mechanism, might not collaborate otherwise. There is now also a third trend, where these two methods come together to use high-tech open-source (e.g. 3D printing) but customized local solutions for sustainable development. Open Design holds great potential in driving future innovation as recent research has proven that stakeholder users working together produce more innovative designs than designers consulting users through more traditional means.

Open machine design as compared to open-source software

The open-design movement is currently fairly nascent but holds great potential for the future. In some respects design and engineering are even more suited to open collaborative development than the increasingly common open-source software projects, because with 3D models and photographs the concept can often be understood visually. It is not even necessary that the project members speak the same languages to usefully collaborate.

However, there are certain barriers to overcome for open design when compared to software development where there are mature and widely used tools available and the duplication and distribution of code cost next to nothing. Creating, testing and modifying physical designs is not quite so straightforward because of the effort, time and cost required to create the physical artefact; although with access to emerging flexible computer-controlled manufacturing techniques the complexity and effort of construction can be significantly reduced (see tools mentioned in the fab lab article).

Organizations 

Open design is currently a fledgling movement consisting of several unrelated or loosely related initiatives. Many of these organizations are single, funded projects, while a few organizations are focusing on an area needing development. In some cases (e.g. Thingiverse for 3D printable designs or Appropedia for open source appropriate technology) organizations are making an effort to create a centralized open source design repository as this enables innovation. Notable organizations include:

 AguaClara, an open-source engineering group at Cornell University publishing a design tool and CAD designs for water treatment plants
 Arduino, an open-source electronics hardware platform, community and company
 Elektor: electronics
 GrabCAD: Free online sharing CAD files
 Instructables : miscellaneous
 Local Motors : methods of transport, vehicles
 LittleBits
 One Laptop Per Child, a project to give every child in developing territories a laptop computer with open hardware and software
 OpenCores : digital electronic hardware
 Open Architecture Network : places. to shelter
 Open Hardware and Design Alliance (OHANDA)
 OpenStructures (OSP), a modular construction model where everyone designs on the basis of one shared geometrical grid.
 Open Source Ecology, including solar cells
 Sensorica A collaborative open source hardware Open Value Network (virtual organisation) 
 Thingiverse : miscellaneous
 VOICED
 VIA OpenBook netbook has CAD files for the design licensed under the Creative Commons Attribution Share Alike 3.0 Unported License
 Wikispeed, open-source modular vehicles
 Zoetrope, open design low cost wind turbine.

See also

3D printing services
Commons-based peer production
Co-creation
Knowledge commons
Modular design
OpenBTS
Open manufacturing
Open-source appropriate technology
Open-source architecture
Open-source hardware
Open Source Initiative
Open-source software
Open standard and Open standardization
Open Design Alliance

References

External links

Episodes of Collective Invention (Peter B. Meyer, August 2003) An article on several historical examples of what could be called "open design"
"Lawrence Lessig and the Creative Commons Developing Nations License" (Alex Steffen, November 2006) An interview with Lawrence Lessig on the use of the Developing Nations License by Architecture for Humanity to create a global open design network
"In the Next Industrial Revolution, Atoms Are the New Bits" (Chris Anderson, Wired February 2010)

Design
Open-source hardware
Free culture movement
Open design
Articles containing video clips